Microvelia is a genus of aquatic bugs in the family Veliidae. There are at least 230 described species in Microvelia.

Species
 List of Microvelia species

Illustrations

References

Veliidae
Gerromorpha genera
Taxa named by John O. Westwood